Singmaster's conjecture is a conjecture in combinatorial number theory, named after the British mathematician David Singmaster who proposed it in 1971. It says that there is a finite upper bound on the multiplicities of entries in Pascal's triangle (other than the number 1, which appears infinitely many times).  It is clear that the only number that appears infinitely many times in Pascal's triangle is 1, because any other number x can appear only within the first x + 1 rows of the triangle.

Statement
Let N(a) be the number of times the number a > 1 appears in Pascal's triangle.  In big O notation, the conjecture is:

Known bound

Singmaster (1971) showed that

Abbot, Erdős, and Hanson (1974) (see References) refined the estimate to:

The best currently known (unconditional) bound is

and is due to Kane (2007).  Abbot, Erdős, and Hanson note that conditional on Cramér's conjecture on gaps between consecutive primes that

holds for every .

Singmaster (1975) showed that the Diophantine equation

has infinitely many solutions for the two variables n, k.  It follows that there are infinitely many triangle entries of multiplicity at least 6:  For any non-negative i, a number a with six appearances in Pascal's triangle is given by either of the above two expressions with

where Fj is the jth Fibonacci number (indexed according to the convention that F0 = 0 and F1 = 1).

Elementary examples

 2 appears just once; all larger positive integers appear more than once;
 3, 4, 5 each appear two times; infinitely many appear exactly twice;
 all odd prime numbers appear two times;
 6 appears three times, as do all central binomial coefficients except for 1 and 2; (it is in principle not excluded that such a coefficient would appear 5, 7 or more times, but no such example is known)
 all numbers of the form  for prime  appear four times;
 Infinitely many appear exactly six times, including each of the following:
 

 

 

 

 

 

 The next number in Singmaster's infinite family (given in terms of Fibonacci numbers), and the next smallest number known to occur six or more times, is :

 

 The smallest number to appear eight times – indeed, the only number known to appear eight times – is 3003, which is also a member of Singmaster's infinite family of numbers with multiplicity at least 6:

 

The number of times n appears in Pascal's triangle is
∞, 1, 2, 2, 2, 3, 2, 2, 2, 4, 2, 2, 2, 2, 4, 2, 2, 2, 2, 3, 4, 2, 2, 2, 2, 2, 2, 4, 2, 2, 2, 2, 2, 2, 4, 4, 2, 2, 2, 2, 2, 2, 2, 2, 4, 2, 2, 2, 2, 2, 2, 2, 2, 2, 4, 4, 2, 2, 2, 2, 2, 2, 2, 2, 2, 4, 2, 2, 2, 3, 2, 2, 2, 2, 2, 2, 2, 4, 2, 2, 2, 2, 2, 4, 2, 2, 2, 2, 2, 2, 4, 2, 2, 2, 2, 2, 2, 2, 2, 2, 2, 2, 2, 2, 4, 2, 2, 2, 2, 2, 2, 2, 2, 2, 2, 2, 2, 2, 2, 6, 2, 2, 2, 2, 2, 4, 2, 2, ... 

By Abbott, Erdős, and Hanson (1974), the number of integers no larger than x that appear more than twice in Pascal's triangle is O(x1/2).

The smallest natural number (above 1) that appears (at least) n times in Pascal's triangle is
2, 3, 6, 10, 120, 120, 3003, 3003, ... 

The numbers which appear at least five times in Pascal's triangle are
1, 120, 210, 1540, 3003, 7140, 11628, 24310, 61218182743304701891431482520, ... 

Of these, the ones in Singmaster's infinite family are
1, 3003, 61218182743304701891431482520, ...

Open questions

It is not known whether any number appears more than eight times, nor whether any number besides 3003 appears that many times.  The conjectured finite upper bound could be as small as 8, but Singmaster thought it might be 10 or 12.

Do any numbers appear exactly five or seven times?
It would appear from a related sequence  that no one knows whether the equation N(a) = 5 can be solved for a. It is also unknown whether there is any number which appears seven times.

See also
 Binomial coefficient

References

.

.

.

.

Combinatorics
Factorial and binomial topics
Triangles of numbers
Conjectures
Unsolved problems in number theory